Capabatus raffrayi is a species of beetle in the family Carabidae, the only species in the genus Capabatus.

References

Pterostichinae
Monotypic Carabidae genera